Ann Thomas may refer to:

Ann Maddocks, née Ann Thomas, Welsh maid
Ann Griffiths, née Ann Thomas, Welsh writer
Ann Thomas (darts player) in World Masters (darts)

See also
Thomas (surname)